Aleksey Vitalyevich  Filimonov is a Russian actor. Winner of the  Kinotavr 2014.

Biography
Aleksey was born on February 3, 1981. He studied at the  Irkutsk Theater School  and worked in various theaters in Russia. In 2005 he made his film debut.

Selected filmography

References

External links 
 Aleksey Filimonov on kino-teatr.ru

Russian male film actors
1981 births
Living people
Actors from Irkutsk
Russian male television actors
21st-century Russian male actors